Serbia competed at the 2011 Summer Universiade in Shenzhen, China.

Medalists

Basketball

Serbia has qualified a men's team.

Water polo 

Serbia has qualified a men's team.

Shooting

Serbia has qualified three men and three women.

Men

Women

References

2011 in Serbian sport
Nations at the 2011 Summer Universiade
2011